Monday Morning may refer to:

Music
Monday Morning (band), an American Christian rock band
"Monday Morning" (Fleetwood Mac song), 1975
"Monday Morning" (Melanie Fiona song), 2009
"Monday Morning", a folk song most famously sung by Peter, Paul and Mary on the 1965 album A Song Will Rise
"Monday Morning", a song by the Candyskins from Sunday Morning Fever, 1996
"Monday Morning", a song by Christina Aguilera from Bionic, 2010
"Monday Morning", a song by Death Cab for Cutie from Codes and Keys, 2011
"Monday Morning", a song by Pulp from Different Class, 1995
"Monday Morning", a song by Robyn from My Truth, 1999

Other
Monday Morning (company), a think tank with headquarters in Copenhagen
Monday Morning (film), a 2002 film by Otar Iosseliani
Monday Morning, a 2012 film by Nat Christian
Monday Morning (magazine), a Lebanese English-language magazine
Monday Morning (newsletter), a student media platform at NIT Rourkela, India
Monday Morning, a 1925 novel by Patrick Hamilton
Monday Mornings, a 2013 American medical drama television series

See also